Attila Sánta (born 22 August 1988 in Kalocsa) is a Hungarian football player who currently plays for FC Dabas.

External links
Profile at HLSZ.hu

1988 births
Living people
Hungarian footballers
Association football midfielders
Győri ETO FC players
Kecskeméti TE players
Budaörsi SC footballers
Ceglédi VSE footballers
BKV Előre SC footballers
FC Dabas footballers
Nemzeti Bajnokság I players
Nemzeti Bajnokság II players